ATP synthase subunit e, mitochondrial is an enzyme that in humans is encoded by the ATP5ME gene.

Mitochondrial ATP synthase catalyzes ATP synthesis, utilizing an electrochemical gradient of protons across the inner membrane during oxidative phosphorylation. It is composed of two linked multi-subunit complexes: the soluble catalytic core, F1, and the membrane-spanning component, Fo, which comprises the proton channel. The F1 complex consists of 5 different subunits (alpha, beta, gamma, delta, and epsilon) assembled in a ratio of 3 alpha, 3 beta, and a single representative of the other 3. The Fo seems to have nine subunits (a, b, c, d, e, f, g, F6 and 8). This gene encodes the e subunit of the Fo complex.

In yeast, the FO complex E subunit appears to play an important role in supporting F-ATPase dimerisation. This subunit is anchored to the inner mitochondrial membrane via its N-terminal region, which is involved in stabilising subunits G and K of the FO complex. The C-terminal region of subunit E is hydrophilic, protruding into the intermembrane space where it can also help stabilise the F-ATPase dimer complex.

References

External links

Further reading